Taiwanaphis is the sole genus in Taiwanaphidinae: a monotypic subfamily of the family Aphididae.

References

Aphididae
Hemiptera subfamilies
Sternorrhyncha genera